Emma Yong Oi-Mun (20 January 1975 – 2 May 2012) was a Singaporean actress and singer. She was an actress for MediaCorp from the late 1990s until her death. She appeared in the film, The Blue Mansion, in 2009 and she was in the music group called Dim Sum Dollies. She died of stomach cancer.

Education 
Yong studied in Raffles Girls' School and then Raffles Junior College and won the Angus Ross prize – given to the A-level student with the best English literature exam score outside of the United Kingdom – in 1994.

In 2002, Yong went to Mountview Academy of Theatre Arts, London where she graduated with a postgraduate degree in musical theatre.

Acting career 
After Yong finished her A-Levels, she went for open auditions and was cast in musicals Bugis Street (1994) and Mortal Sins (1995).

Filmography

Theatre 

 Bugis Street (1994) 
 Mortal Sins (1995)

 Ka-Ra-you-OK? as Electric Geisha (1996)
 Cabaret as Sally Bowles (2006)
 Shanghai Blues (2008)
 Beauty And The Beast (2009)
 Cinderel-lah! (2010)
 Into The Woods (2011)

Personal life
Yong married actor Gerald Chew in 2003 and divorced 9 months later. 

In January 2011, Yong was diagnosed with stomach cancer. A few months later, she married her long time boyfriend, Jerry Lim, an interior designer. She started treatment for her cancer after her marriage. The treatment went well and the cancer was in remission. A routine scan in September showed her cancer relapsed.

Death 
Yong died on 2 May 2012 aged 37, after a 17-month battle with the disease. Yong is survived by her parents and two sisters.

An Emma Yong Fund was set up after her death to helps artists who are critically ill. A memorial concert was held in remembrance of Yong and to raise money for the Fund. The concert was held at the Esplanade who loaned the use of its Concert Hall for free with all performers performing for free. Ticketing agent, SISTIC, also donated the collected handling fees to charity. Performers included the two other Dim Sum Dollies, Selena Tan and Pam Oei, Sebastian "Broadway Beng" Tan, Karen Tan, Tan Kheng Hua, Denise Tan (who replaced Yong as one of the Dim Sum Dollies), Ivan Heng and Glen Goei. More than $275,500 was raised through the concert.

References 

1975 births
Singaporean actresses
21st-century Singaporean women singers
2012 deaths
Raffles Junior College alumni
Deaths from cancer in Singapore